Phyllonorycter pseudolautella is a moth of the family Gracillariidae. It is known from the islands of Hokkaidō and Honshū in Japan and from the Russian Far East.

The wingspan is 6-7.5 mm.

The larvae feed on Quercus crispula, Quercus mongolica and Quercus serrata. They mine the leaves of their host plant. The mine has the form of a ptychonomous blotch mine situated between two veins on the underside of the leaf.

References

pseudolautella
Moths of Asia
Moths described in 1963